Euil "Snitz" Snider (December 9, 1905 – February 9, 1978) was an American sprinter. He competed in the men's 400 metres at the 1928 Summer Olympics.  He graduated from Oak Grove High School in Jefferson County, Alabama and was on the track team at Auburn University.  He was the head football coach at Bessemer High School from 1933 to 1963 and was later inducted into the Alabama Sports Hall of Fame.  Snider died on February 9, 1978.  In 1972, Bessemer Stadium where he had coached the Tigers for thirty years was renamed "Snitz Snider Stadium" in his honor.

Head coaching record

References

External links
 

1905 births
1978 deaths
American male sprinters
American men's basketball players
Auburn Tigers football players
Auburn Tigers men's basketball players
College track and field coaches in the United States
High school baseball coaches in the United States
High school basketball coaches in Alabama
High school football coaches in Alabama
Samford Bulldogs athletic directors
Samford Bulldogs football coaches
Athletes (track and field) at the 1928 Summer Olympics
Olympic track and field athletes of the United States
People from Jefferson County, Alabama
Coaches of American football from Alabama
Players of American football from Alabama
Baseball coaches from Alabama
Basketball coaches from Alabama
Basketball players from Alabama
Track and field athletes from Alabama